Banneker High School (also known as Benjamin Banneker High School) is a public high school in unincorporated Fulton County, Georgia, United States, with a College Park, Georgia postal address. It is part of the Fulton County School System and named for Benjamin Banneker, a free African-American almanac author, surveyor, landowner and farmer.

Notable alumni 
 Greg Blue - former professional football player
 Toby Johnson - former professional football player
 Mr. Collipark - hip-hop record producer
 Ludacris - rapper and actor
 Mr. DJ - hip-hop record producer and DJ
 Jason Rogers - professional baseball player
 Supa Nate - rapper
 Darius Watts - former professional football player

References

External links 
 

Fulton County School System high schools
Benjamin Banneker